The 2011 Big East Conference men's soccer tournament is the 2011 edition of the tournament, which determines the men's college soccer champion of the Big East Conference, as well as the conference's automatic berth into the 2011 NCAA Division I Men's Soccer Championship. The tournament will begin on November 2, 2011 and conclude with the Big East championship on November 13, 2011. The championship, along with the semifinal fixtures will be played at soccer-specific stadium Red Bull Arena in Harrison, New Jersey.

Qualification

Bracket

Schedule 
The tournament will begin on November 2, 2011

First round 
The home team is listed on the right, the away team is listed on the left.

Quarterfinals

Semifinals

Championship

See also 
 Big East Conference
 2011 Big East Conference men's soccer season
 2011 in American soccer
 2011 NCAA Division I Men's Soccer Championship
 2011 NCAA Division I men's soccer season

References

External links
 Big East Conference Tournament Central

-
Big East Conference Men's Soccer Tournament